The Opel 10/30 (10/35) PS is a Luxury car produced by the German automaker Opel, and was built from 1922 to 1924. It was available as an open topped six seater or as a six-seater sedan. Because of its arrow shaped radiator it was also known as "pointed nose".

The six seater sedan cost 12,000 and the open six seater 10,500 Goldmark in 1934.

10 30 (10 35) PS
Cars introduced in 1922